is a former Japanese world-class marathon runner. He represented his native country at the 1988 Summer Olympics in Seoul, South Korea, the 1992 Summer Olympics in Barcelona, Spain and the 1986 Asian Games in Seoul, South Korea (gold medal).

Nakayama's notable marathon wins include Fukuoka Marathon (1984, 1987), Seoul marathon (1985), and Tokyo marathon (1990). In 1985 Nakayama set the 2nd record in the world from the 1st World Cup Marathon (2:08:15). , Nakayama is a coach at the Aichi Seiko Track Team.

Achievements

References

Association of Road Racing Statisticians (ARRS) profile.

1959 births
Living people
Japanese male long-distance runners
Japanese male marathon runners
Olympic male marathon runners
Olympic athletes of Japan
Athletes (track and field) at the 1988 Summer Olympics
Athletes (track and field) at the 1992 Summer Olympics
Asian Games gold medalists for Japan
Asian Games gold medalists in athletics (track and field)
Athletes (track and field) at the 1986 Asian Games
Medalists at the 1986 Asian Games
World Athletics Championships athletes for Japan
Japan Championships in Athletics winners
20th-century Japanese people
21st-century Japanese people